"Shower" is a song by American singer Becky G. It was released on April 23, 2014, by Kemosabe Records and RCA Records. The song was written by Dr. Luke, Cirkut, and Rock City and it was produced by the former two. Its music video was released on June 30, 2014. "Shower" was Gomez's only top 20 hit in the United States until her single "Mamiii" released in 2022. The song is certified multi-platinum by the Recording Industry Association of America (RIAA) for selling over 2 million copies in the country. The official remix features American rapper Tyga.

Background and release
"Shower" was released for retail via digital distribution on April 23, 2014. The audio for the song was also uploaded to YouTube and VEVO on the same day of its release.

Composition
It is composed in the D Major scale at 120BPM. It follows the chord progression of G-D-Bm-A. Musically, "Shower" is a teen pop and melodic rap song. The track was written by Dr. Luke, Cirkut, and Rock City before being presented to Gomez, who contributed to the bridge. Lyrically, it is a "breezy ode to first love". Gomez has said, "Everyone can relate to the song, even if you don't understand the words."

Music video
The video was released on June 30, 2014, via VEVO, being uploaded on YouTube the following day. It features cameo appearances by American rappers T. Mills and Doja Cat. Gomez explained the concept: "We wanted to capture moments of feeling good, and me personally when I feel good is when I'm hanging out with friends or that special person. It's a party basically..." MTV described the visuals as "carefree". As of April 2022, the music video for "Shower" has over 472 million views on YouTube.

Reception
BuzzFeed called the song "2014's 'Call Me Maybe'" and said that it is "kind of awful and you'll love it". Maximum Pop! compared the single to the work of Gomez's previous duet partner Cher Lloyd and described it as "a bubbly future pop hit." Time said the song "is such a seasonally appropriate sugar rush that it's borderline preposterous the song hasn't been a more serious contender for Song of the Summer."

Commercial performance
"Shower" debuted at number 88 on the US Billboard Hot 100 chart before peaking at number 16 on the charts, making it her first solo entry and second overall after her collaboration with Lloyd in 2012. The song debuted at number 39 on the Rhythmic Songs chart and 36 on the Billboard Pop Songs on the week dated for June 21, 2014. It also debuted at number 48 on Hot Digital Songs on the week ending June 28, 2014. It peaked at number 1 on the US Heatseekers chart.
By the end of November 2020, the song became a viral hit on the social media platform TikTok, generating around 6.3 million videos.

Awards and nominations

Charts

Weekly charts

Year-end charts

Certifications

References 

2014 singles
2014 songs
Song recordings produced by Dr. Luke
Songs written by Dr. Luke
Songs written by Cirkut (record producer)
Songs written by Theron Thomas
Songs written by Timothy Thomas
Becky G songs
Songs written by Becky G